Francesca Falzon Young (born 3 February 2001) is a Maltese swimmer. She competed in the women's 100 metre freestyle event at the 2018 FINA World Swimming Championships (25 m), in Hangzhou, China.

References

2001 births
Living people
Maltese female swimmers
Maltese female freestyle swimmers
Place of birth missing (living people)